The Southern Governorate has the largest area of the four governorates of Bahrain, and the smallest population (91,450). It includes parts of Bahrain's old municipalities – Al Mintaqah al Gharbiyah, Ar Rifa' wa al Mintaqah al Janubiyah, and Juzur Hawar (the Hawar Islands). It is the least populated of the regions on Bahrain.

The Governor of the Southern Governorate is Shaikh Khalifa bin Ali Al-Khalifa (b. 1993), the grandson of former Prime Minister Prince Khalifa bin Salman Al Khalifa and the son of Shaikh Ali bin Khalifa Al Khalifa, the Deputy Prime Minister.

Regions that are part of the governate
Riffa
Isa Town
Ma'ameer
Awali
Askar
Jaww
Al Dur
Zallaq
Hawar Islands
Khalifa City
Sakhir
Durrat Al Bahrain

References 

Governorates of Bahrain